The 1966 UK & Ireland Greyhound Racing Year was the 40th year of greyhound racing in the United Kingdom and Ireland.

Roll of honour

Summary
The industry celebrated its 40th anniversary but the event was marred by the government extended betting tax to all greyhound tracks and attendances suffered because of the 1966 World Cup. Wembley however refused to cancel regular greyhound racing resulting in the World Cup match between Uruguay and France being played at White City Stadium.

Dusty Trail is voted Greyhound of the Year after winning the Scottish Greyhound Derby, Select Stakes, International at Wimbledon and Anglo Irish International at White City, in addition to finishing runner-up in the Welsh Derby and reaching the Laurels final.

Competitions
The racing schedule suffered bad organisation, with the Welsh Greyhound Derby, Oaks and Scurry Gold Cup all clashing in July and the Scottish Greyhound Derby and St Leger clashing in September. The Regency at Brighton & Hove Greyhound Stadium changed status from a produce race for British Bred greyhounds to an open competition for all-comers.

Halfpenny King nearly won the triple crown of jumping; after winning the English Grand National and Scottish Grand National he headed for  Arms Park but finished second.

Tracks
After eighteen years of attempting to gain a licence to run under National Greyhound Racing Club rules without success the Cradley Heath track were finally given a licence. The management led by Fred Jeffcott (the breeder of Fine Jubilee) and Racing Manager Lionel Clemmow started NGRC racing for the first time in September. Charlton Stadium re-opened, it had closed in 1962 and it took possession of the Olympic and Cloth of Gold from Wandsworth Stadium which closed.

Slough Stadium was purchased by the Greyhound Racing Association (GRA) and the Clapton Stadium shareholders contemplated a bid from GRA which included two training sites with 180 acres and an interest in the West Ham Stadium site. The deal goes ahead later in the year but there were concerns regarding the fact that the GRA policy was now buying and selling property sites. Both Horsley Hill in South Shields and Gateshead closed.

Wisbech Greyhound Stadium owner Herbert Barrett purchased independent track King's Lynn Stadium and introduced greyhound racing there.

News
The Greyhound Express received a phone call from an Irishman asking if the reward for missing Juvenile winner Hi Joe was still on offer (he had been stolen the previous year). His trainer Noreen Collin contacted owner Victor Chandler and he said that it had been reduced from £2,000 to £1,000. The man called again and a meeting was arranged in the Three Greyhounds pup in Soho, where it was agreed that the reward would be paid through a lawyer but the police had been alerted and Detective Peter Jarrott tracked the case to a wooden garage in Dunstable and Hi Joe was found with some pups. The garage belonged to Bartholomew Casey and he had raced Hi Joe on the Bletchley flapping track under the name of Super Black. The culprit was caught and sent to court, but were released due to a bizarre ancient law stating that if a stolen dog goes missing for more than six months you cannot be charged with theft. However Casey was charged with stealing the dog's coat.

Ireland
Val's Prince gained revenge on Always Proud during the Guinness 600, winning by three lengths from his rival. Always Proud had defeated Val's Prince in the final of the Irish Greyhound Derby.

Clomoney Grand won two major events by taking the Easter Cup and Callanan Cup.

Ballybunion opened for racing on 18 May.

Principal UK races

Totalisator returns

The totalisator returns declared to the licensing authorities for the year 1966 are listed below.

References 

Greyhound racing in the United Kingdom
Greyhound racing in the Republic of Ireland
UK and Ireland Greyhound Racing Year
UK and Ireland Greyhound Racing Year
UK and Ireland Greyhound Racing Year
UK and Ireland Greyhound Racing Year